Ian Tomlinson  is a director of the Institute of Cancer and Genomic Sciences at the University of Birmingham.

Career and research
Highlights of Tomlinson's research include the discovery of colorectal cancer genes and kidney cancer predisposition genes that are transferred by Mendelian inheritance.

Awards and honours
Tomlinson was elected a Fellow of the Royal Society in 2019 for "substantial contributions to the improvement of natural knowledge". He is also elected a Fellow of the Academy of Medical Sciences (FMedSci) in 2009.

References

Fellows of the Royal Society
Fellows of the Academy of Medical Sciences (United Kingdom)
Year of birth missing (living people)
Living people